Bulgarian Volleyball Federation (Bulgarian: Българска Федерация по Волейбол, Bŭlgarska Federatsiya po Voleĭbol) is the governing body of volleyball in Bulgaria.
The teams of the national club competition, the SuperLeague are:

CSKA Sofia
Neftochimic 2010
Levski Volley
VC Pirin Razlog
VC Marek Union-Ivkoni
Cherno More BASK
Arda
Montana Volley
Botev Lukovit
Victoria Volley
VC Gabrovo
VC Slavia Sofia

The "Vissha Liga" teams are:

VC Dunav Ruse
Teteven Volley
VC Dobrudzha 07 Dobrich
Hyster Volley LTU
VC UNWE Sofia
VC Septemvri Pro Cinema
VC Minyor Pernik
VC Rodopa Smolyan
Izgrev Volley Yablanitsa

See also
Bulgaria men's team
Bulgaria men's U19 team
Bulgaria men's U21 team
Bulgaria men's U23 team
Bulgaria women's team
Bulgaria women's U18 team
Bulgaria women's U20 team
Bulgaria women's U23 team

References

External links

Bulgarian
Volleyball
Volleyball in Bulgaria